Joseph Edward Sabasteanski (February 24, 1921 – July 1, 1972) was an American football offensive lineman and linebacker who played in the National Football League (NFL).

College career
Sabasteanski was a member of the football and track and field teams while at Fordham University. He replaced Lou DeFilippo as the Rams starting center and started in the team's 1942 Sugar Bowl victory over Missouri. As a senior, Sabasteanski was named to the "Eastern Eleven"  and an honorable mention All-American by the Associated Press and played in the 1943 East–West Shrine Bowl.

Sabasteanski competed in the 16 pound hammer throw on the track and field team. He won the event at the  Metropolitan Intercollegiate Track and Field Championships in 1941 and 1942. He gave up his senior track and field season to enter the Marine Corps during WWII.

Professional career
Sabasteanski was selected by the Brooklyn Dodgers in the 11th round of the 1943 NFL Draft. He signed with the Boston Yanks in January of 1946 after being discharged from the Marines. He played two seasons with the Yanks and another with the team after they relocated and became the New York Bulldogs.

Coaching career and later life
Sabasteanski returned to Fordham as an offensive line coach in 1951. He joined the coaching staff at Adelphi University in 1952 and was the Panthers head coach in 1953, compiling a record of 4-3-1 in the final season before the football program was discontinued.

Sabasteanski died on July 1, 1972. He was posthumously inducted into the Fordham Athletics Hall of Fame in 1988 and the Maine Sports Hall of Fame in 1990.

References

External links
Fordham Athletic Hall of Fame bio
Maine Sports Hall of Fame bio

1921 births
1972 deaths
Boston Yanks players
Fordham Rams football players
Fordham Rams men's track and field athletes
Players of American football from Maine
Sportspeople from Portland, Maine
Adelphi Panthers football coaches
New York Bulldogs players
Fordham Rams football coaches
Marine corps officers
American hammer throwers
Portland High School (Maine) alumni